The Pearl River Delta Metropolitan Region (PRD;) is the low-lying area surrounding the Pearl River estuary, where the Pearl River flows into the South China Sea. Referred to as the Guangdong-Hong Kong-Macao Greater Bay Area in official documents, the region is one of the most densely populated and urbanized regions in the world, and is considered a megacity by numerous scholars. It is currently the wealthiest region in Southern China and one of the wealthiest regions in China along with the Yangtze River Delta in Eastern China and Jingjinji in Northern China. Most of the region is part of the Pearl River Delta Economic Zone, which is a special economic zone of China.

The region is a megalopolis, and is at the southern end of a larger megalopolis running along the southern coast of China, which include metropolises such as Chaoshan, Zhangzhou-Xiamen, Quanzhou-Putian and Fuzhou. The nine largest cities of the PRD had a combined population of 57.15 million at the end of 2013, comprising 53.69% of the provincial population. According to the World Bank Group, the PRD has become the largest urban area in the world in both size and population. The region's traditional language is Cantonese; in the late 20th century and the 21st century, due to the high inflow of migrant workers coming from other regions, Mandarin has gradually became a lingua franca.

The west side of this region, along with Chaoshan, was also the source of much Chinese emigration from the 19th to the mid 20th centuries, including to the Western world, where they formed many Chinatowns. Today, much of the Chinese diaspora in the US, Canada, Australia, Latin America, and much of Southeast Asia traces their ancestry to the west side of this region.

Geography 

The river delta, also known as the Golden Delta of Guangdong, is formed by three major rivers, the Xi Jiang (West River), Bei Jiang (North River), and Dong Jiang (East River). The flat lands of the delta are criss-crossed by a network of tributaries and distributaries of the Pearl River. The Pearl River Delta is actually two alluvial deltas, separated by the core branch of the Pearl River. The Bei Jiang and Xi Jiang converge to flow into the South China Sea and Pearl River in the west, while the Dong Jiang only flows into the Pearl River proper in the east.

The Xi Jiang begins exhibiting delta-like characteristics as far west as Zhaoqing, although this city is not usually considered a part of the PRD region. After passing through the Lingyang Gorge and converging with the Bei Jiang, the Xi Jiang opens up and flows as far east as Nansha District and as far west as Xinhui. Major distributaries of the Xi include Donghui Shuidao, Jiya Shuidao, Hutiaomen Shuidao, Yinzhou Hu, and the main branch of the Xi Jiang. Jiangmen and Zhongshan are the major cities found in the western section of the delta. 

The Bei Jiang enters the delta plains at Qingyuan but doesn't begin to split until near Sanshui. From here the two main distributaries are Tanzhou Shuidao and Shunde Shuidao which form multiple mouths along the west side of the Pearl River's estuary. Two other distributaries, Lubao Yong and Xinan Yong, split from the Bei further north and converge with the Liuxi He to form the main branch of the Pearl River just north of Guangzhou. The other major city in the north section of the delta is Foshan. 

The Dong Jiang flows through Huizhou into the delta. It begins diverging northeast of Dongguan into many distributaries, including the Dongguan Shuidao. Distributuares enter the Pearl River as far north as Luogang and as far south as Hu Men (Tiger Gate).

Saltwater crocodiles were present within the Pearl River estuary during antiquity.

Location and demographics 

As well as the delta itself, the term Pearl River Delta refers to the dense network of cities that covers nine prefectures of the province of Guangdong, namely Dongguan, Foshan, Guangzhou, Huizhou, Jiangmen, Shenzhen, Zhaoqing, Zhongshan and Zhuhai and the SARs of Hong Kong and Macau. The 2010/2011 State of the World Cities report, published by the United Nations Human Settlements Programme, estimates the population of the delta region at 120 million people; it is rapidly urbanising.

The eastern side of the PRD (Shenzhen, Dongguan), dominated by foreign capital, is the most developed economically. The western areas (Foshan, Zhuhai, Zhongshan, Jiangmen), dominated by local private capital, are open for development. New transport links between Hong Kong, Macau and Zhuhai in the PRD are expected to open up new areas for development, further integrate the cities, and facilitate trade within the region. The Hong Kong–Zhuhai–Macau Bridge, and the proposed Shenzhen–Zhongshan Bridge, currently in the planning phase, will be amongst the longest bridges in the world with a total length of approximately  each.

Until 1985, the PRD had been mainly dominated by farms and small rural villages, but after the economy was reformed and opened, a flood of investment turned it into the land's economic powerhouse. The PRD's startling growth was fueled by foreign investment coming largely from Hong Kong manufacturers that moved their operations into the PRD. In 2003, Hong Kong companies employed 11 million workers in their PRD operations. Lately there have been extreme labour shortages in the region due to runaway economic growth which caused wages to rise by about 20 to 30 percent in the past two years.

Economy 

The Pearl River Delta has been one of the most economically dynamic regions of the People's Republic of China since the launch of China's reform programme in 1979. With annual gross domestic product growth of 13.45 percent over three decades since 1978, it is 3.5 percentage points higher than the national average. Since 1978, almost 30% of all foreign investment in China was in the PRD. In 2007 its GDP rose to US$448 billion which makes its economy about the size of Taiwan's and by 2019 this figure has increased to US$2.0 trillion  or about the same size as Canada. The abundance of employment opportunities created a pool of wealthy, middle-income, professional consumers with an annual per capita income that puts them among China's wealthiest. Since the onset of China's reform program, the Pearl River Delta Economic Zone has been the fastest growing portion of the fastest growing province in the fastest growing large economy in the world.

The industrial cities in the Pearl River Delta has been called the "Factory of the World" or the "World's Factory" due to the presence of industrial parks populated with factories from foreign investments. The target market of the delta region's exports, however, has become increasingly domestic rather than foreign. Dongguan, Zhongshan, Nanhai, and Shunde (the later two are now districts of Foshan) the four cities known as the Four Guangdong Dragons for its high growth rates and rapid development from late the 1980s to the 2000s.

Although the Pearl River Delta Economic Zone encompasses only 0.4 percent of the land area and only 3.2 percent of the 2000 Census population of mainland China, it accounted for 8.7 percent of GDP, 35.8 percent of total trade, and 29.2 percent of utilised foreign capital in 2001. By 2016, the Pearl River Delta accounted for 9.1% of China's GDP. These figures show the remarkable level of economic development to which the Pearl River Delta has been subjected in order to become an 'Economic Zone', as well as the international orientation of the region's economy. This orientation has attracted numerous investors from all over the world who use the Greater Pearl River Delta region as a platform for serving global and Chinese markets.

As of 2008, the Central Government has introduced new labor laws, environmental and other regulations to reduce pollution, industrial disputes, produce safer working conditions and protect the environment. The costs of producing low margin and commodity goods have increased. This is on top of the rising cost for energy, food, transport and the appreciation of the Renminbi against the falling US Dollar. Some manufacturers will need to cut costs by moving up the value chain or moving to more undeveloped regions.

Significance of PRD

The Pearl River Delta has become the world's workshop and is a major manufacturing base for products such as electronic products (such as watches and clocks), toys, garments and textiles, plastic products, and a range of other goods. Much of this output is invested by foreign entities and is geared for the export market. The Pearl River Delta Economic Zone accounts for approximately one third of China's trade value.

Private-owned enterprises have developed quickly in the Pearl River Delta Economic Zone and are playing an ever-growing role in the region's economy, particularly after year 2000 when the development environment for private-owned enterprises has been greatly relaxed.

Nearly five percent of the world's goods were produced in the Greater Pearl River Delta in 2001, with a total export value of US$289 billion. Over 70,000 Hong Kong companies have factory plants there.

Transportation

Public transport

Urban rail transport

PRD is served by six different metro systems throughout the metropolitan area consisting of Guangzhou Metro, Shenzhen Metro, MTR, FMetro, Macau Light Rail Transit and Dongguan Rail Transit. In addition, the Pearl River Delta Metropolitan Region intercity railway provides regional transit between cities of the PRD.

Buses, taxis and motorcycles

All cities are served by buses and taxis, while some cities may still offer motorcycle service. The Hong Kong–Zhuhai–Macau Bridge provides a road connection across the Pearl River between Hong Kong, Macau, and Zhuhai, and is regularly traversed by buses and other public transit.

Air transport
PRD is covered by seven civilian airports, with five in Mainland China and two in special administrative regions. Two of the Mainland Airports have international flights.

Mainland China:
 Guangzhou Baiyun International Airport
 Shenzhen Bao'an International Airport
 Zhuhai Jinwan Airport
 Foshan Shadi Airport
 Huizhou Pingtan Airport

Special administrative regions:
 Hong Kong International Airport
 Macau International Airport

Another new airport in the Mainland — Pearl River Delta International Airport — located in Gaoming District, Foshan — is under construction.

Railway and intercity-rail transport

The entire PRD is fully covered by railway, high-speed rail, or intercity-rail services.

 Major stations
 Guangzhou railway station
 Guangzhou East railway station 
 Guangzhou South railway station
 Guangzhou North railway station
 Shenzhen railway station
 Shenzhen North railway station
 Shenzhen East railway station
 Futian railway station
 Hong Kong station and Central station
 Hong Kong West Kowloon railway station
 Hung Hom station
 Zhongshan railway station
 Zhongshan North railway station
 Zhuhai railway station
 Zhuhai North railway station
 Dongguan railway station
 Dongguan East railway station
 Foshan railway station
 Foshan East railway station
 Jiangmen railway station
 Humen railway station
 Huizhou railway station
 Zhaoqing railway station

River transport

There are daily high-speed catamaran services throughout the PRD region.

 Guangzhou Ferry
 Cotai Jet
 New World First Ferry
 TurboJET
 Star Ferry
 Hong Kong & Kowloon Ferry
 Discovery Bay Transportation Services
 Park Island Transport
 Fortune Ferry
 Macao Dragon Company
 Coral Sea Ferry
 Chuen Kee Ferry
 Tsui Wah Ferry

Cities

Subdivision

Pearl River mega-city 

A 2011 article in British newspaper The Telegraph reported on a "Turn The Pearl River Delta Into One" project. The stated goal was to "mesh the transport, energy, water and telecommunications networks of the nine cities together."
(Hong Kong and Macau were not included.) However, the Chinese government denied that such a project existed.

Pollution 

The Pearl River Delta is notoriously polluted, with sewage and industrial waste treatment facilities failing to keep pace with the growth in population and industry in the area. A large portion of the pollution is brought about by factories run by Hong Kong manufacturers in the area. Much of the area is frequently covered with a brown smog. This has a strong effect on the pollution levels in the delta.

Pollution is a great risk to the Chinese white dolphins that inhabit the area.

On March 22, 2007 the World Bank approved a $96 million loan to the PRC government to reduce water pollution in the Pearl River Delta. On December 23, 2008 it was announced that ¥48.6 billion (about $7.1 billion) will be spent on the river by mid-2010 to clean up the river's sewage problems quoted by Zhang Hu, the director of Guangzhou municipal bureau of water affairs. The city will build about 30 water treatment plants, which will treat 2.25 million tonnes of water per day. The program hopes to cut down the amount of sewage in the area by 85%, and was also of fundamental importance for the 2010 Asian Games held in Guangzhou from November 12, 2010 to November 27, 2010.

In October 2009, Greenpeace East Asia released a report, "Poisoning the Pearl River" that detailed the results of a study it conducted in which 25 samples were collected from five manufacturing facilities in the Greater Pearl River Delta. The study concluded that all the facilities sampled were discharging waste-water containing chemicals with proven or suspected hazardous properties including beryllium, copper, manganese, and heavy metals, as well as high levels of organic chemicals. These substances are associated with a long list of health problems such as cancer, endocrine disruption, renal failure and damage to the nervous system as well being known to harm the environment. Three of the five facilities sampled (Qingyuan Top Dragon Co. Ltd, Wing Fung P.C. Board Co. Ltd. and Techwise Qingyuan Circuit Co. Ltd. ) contained concentrations of chemicals which exceeded the limits set by Guangdong provincial effluent standards. These companies were then subjected to a Clean Production Audit according to Article 28 of China's Cleaner Production Promotion Law. Guangdong Environmental Protection Bureau took a stance against the companies by blacklisting them.

Pearl River Delta is a strong source of greenhouse gases as well. Although it is hard to estimate overall greenhouse gas emissions from such a large megacity, scientists have shown that Pearl River Delta exhibits one of the strongest anomalies in carbon dioxide concentration around the world. This enhancement is easily discernible from satellite observations.

See also 

 Bocca Tigris
 Metropolitan regions of China
 Yangtze River Delta
 Yellow River Delta and Bohai Sea
 National Central City
 Huangpu Bridge
 Humen Pearl River Bridge
 Hong Kong-Zhuhai-Macau Bridge
 Shenzhen-Zhongshan Bridge

References

Further reading

External links 

 Economic profile for the Pearl River Delta at HKTDC
 Images from Scientific Visualisation Studio at NASA

 
Delta
River deltas of Asia
Landforms of Guangdong
Landforms of Hong Kong
Geography of South China
Metropolitan areas of China
South China